Ken Ograjenšek (born 30 August 1991) is a Slovenian professional ice hockey player for the Graz99ers of the ICE Hockey League (ICEHL). He previously played two seasons in the French Ligue Magnus with Dauphins d'Épinal before signing a two-year contract with Graz in a return to the EBEL on 4 July 2016.

He has played internationally with the Slovenian national team. He participated at the 2015 IIHF World Championship.

Career statistics

Regular season and playoffs

International

References

External links

1991 births
Living people
Dauphins d'Épinal players
Graz 99ers players
HDD Olimpija Ljubljana players
Slovenian ice hockey forwards
Sportspeople from Celje
Ice hockey players at the 2018 Winter Olympics
Olympic ice hockey players of Slovenia
Competitors at the 2011 Winter Universiade
HK Olimpija players
Slovenian expatriate ice hockey people
Slovenian expatriate sportspeople in Austria
Slovenian expatriate sportspeople in France
Expatriate ice hockey players in Austria
Expatriate ice hockey players in France